The Rural Municipality of Battle River No. 438 is a rural municipality (RM) in the Canadian province of Saskatchewan within Census Division No. 12 and  Division No. 6.

History 
The RM of Battle River No. 438 incorporated as a rural municipality on December 12, 1910.

Geography

Communities and localities 
The following urban municipalities are surrounded by the RM.

Towns
Battleford

The following unincorporated communities are located within the RM.

Organized hamlets
 Delmas

Localities
 Highgate

The following Indian reserves are surrounded by the RM.

First Nations Indian reserves
 Sweet Grass 113
 Sweet Grass 113-M16

Demographics 

Government 
The RM of Battle River No. 438 is governed by an elected municipal council and an appointed administrator that meets on the first Thursday of every month. The reeve of the RM is Stewart Mitchell while its administrator is Betty Johnson. The RM's office is located in Battleford.

See also 
List of communities in Saskatchewan
List of rural municipalities in Saskatchewan

References 

B
Division No. 12, Saskatchewan